Heinrich Ludwig Fütterer (14 October 1931 – 10 February 2019) was a German athlete, who mainly competed in sprint events.

Early life 
He was born in Illingen. 

Fütterer competed for the United Team of Germany in the 1956 Summer Olympics held in Melbourne, Australia, where he won the bronze medal in the 4 × 100 metre relay with his teammates Lothar Knörzer, Leonhard Pohl and Manfred Germar but didn't reach the 100 m final.

In 1954 he won two gold medals at the European Championships in Bern, Switzerland, in 1958 he won the relay with Germany.

His nickname was "weißer Blitz" ("white lightning").

His best time in the 100 meters was 10.2 seconds, equalling the world record held by Jesse Owens and a number of other sprinters. He ran the race in Japan (1954). His best in the 200 meters was 20.8 seconds. He was part of the German world record 4 × 100 m relay of 1958.

Fütterer died in Illingen on 10 February 2019 at the age of 87.

References

Further reading
 Alfons Bitterwolf, Gustav Bitterwolf: Heinz Fütterer, der weiße Blitz. Biografie. Bitterwolf, Illingen/Rastatt 1955, ASIN B0000BGL0Q
 Michael Dittrich, Daniel Merkel: Der "Weiße Blitz" – Das Leben des Heinz Fütterer. Verlag Die Werkstatt, Göttingen 2006, 

1931 births
2019 deaths
Athletes (track and field) at the 1956 Summer Olympics
German male sprinters
Olympic athletes of the United Team of Germany
Olympic bronze medalists for the United Team of Germany
European Athletics Championships medalists
Medalists at the 1956 Summer Olympics
Olympic bronze medalists in athletics (track and field)
Recipients of the Cross of the Order of Merit of the Federal Republic of Germany
People from Rastatt (district)
Sportspeople from Karlsruhe (region)